Adam Lovelock (born 12 December 1982 in Canberra) is a retired Australian professional boxer. Lovelock was ranked in the Australian National Boxing Federation (ANBF) and by the World Boxing Council (WBC), after winning the WBCABCO Cruiserweight (boxing) title in 2012. Lovelock is now a Boxing Matchmaker and Sports commentator for Australian Professional boxing.

Education  
Lovelock held a scholarship in the Talented Sports program at Erindale College in Canberra.

Amateur Boxing 
Lovelock held an amateur boxing record of 73 Wins, 11 Losses, and was affiliated with Boxing Australia. Lovelock was a multiple State, and two time National Amateur Champion. Lovelock trained out of the Australian Institute of Sport.

Professional career 
Lovelock retired with a professional Boxing record of 12 wins, 7 losses, and competed out of Canberra and Brisbane.

Professional Boxing Titles 
·QLD State

·WBF Australasian

·WBC Continental

Notable bouts 
In 2016, Lovelock traveled to Tokyo, Japan, fighting Japanese World Champion Kyotaro Fujimoto.

References

External links 
Adam Lovelock vs James Chan Fox Sports televised bout
Adam Lovelock vs Kyle Brumby QLD Cruiserweight Title bout

Living people
1982 births
Australian male boxers
Cruiserweight boxers
Sportspeople from Canberra